Charles O'Connor may refer to:

 Charles O'Connor (politician) (1878–1940), American lawyer and politician
 Charles O'Connor (judge) (1854–1928), Irish judge, the last Master of the Rolls in Ireland
 Charles Yelverton O'Connor (1843–1902), Irish-born engineer of New Zealand and Australia
 Charles O'Connor (musician) (born 1948), English musician, member of the Irish group Horslips

See also 
 Charles O'Conor (disambiguation)
Charles Connor (disambiguation)